The Sulawesian toad or Celebes toad (Ingerophrynus celebensis) is a species of toad in the family Bufonidae. It is endemic to Sulawesi, Indonesia.
It is a common and abundant species found in a wide range of habitats, including primary rainforest, secondary forest, plantations, cultivated land and towns. Breeding takes place in ponds, paddy fields, and pools within slow-moving streams.

References

celebensis
Endemic fauna of Indonesia
Amphibians of Sulawesi
Amphibians described in 1859
Taxa named by Albert Günther
Taxonomy articles created by Polbot